AKMU, also known as Akdong Musician, is a South Korean sibling duo consisting of Lee Chan-hyuk and Lee Su-hyun who debuted under YG Entertainment in April 2014 with studio album Play after winning SBS' K-pop Star 2.

Their debut album Play was well received by the public and critics, having sold more than 6.9 million downloads, and was awarded "Best Pop Album" in the 12th Korean Music Awards. The follow up albums Spring and Winter furthered their success. As of March 2017, they have sold over 23 million digital sales in South Korea.

Career

Pre-debut: K-pop Star 2 
Lee Chan-hyuk and Lee Su-hyun lived with their missionary parents in Mongolia for almost five years before returning to South Korea to pursue a career in the music industry. While in Mongolia, they were home-schooled by their mother. The siblings, under the name Akdong Musician, joined their first label, the Proteurment agency and soon performed on several stages and even released an original song titled "Galaxy", which later was used as a soundtrack for a Samsung Galaxy S4 film commercial in May 2013.

In August 2012, the duo participated in the preliminary auditions of K-pop Star 2, at Jamsil Arena in Seoul. They soon passed and were eligible to perform in the first round, where they sang a cover of Miss A's "Breathe" and an original song titled "Don't Cross Your Legs". One of the judges, Park Jin-young, praised the chemistry between the siblings and the techniques they had incorporated in their performances. BoA praised the lyrics of their original song, while Yang Hyun-suk, described them as "true artists". The duo continued to awe the judges, until after where their lack of confidence resulted in lukewarm performances in the succeeding rounds. In spite of this, they finished the competition in first place. Some of their original songs performed were released under LOEN Entertainment, where "You are Attractive", for example, was released on 12 December and immediately reached number one on the Gaon charts. Despite not being signed under an agency, they participated in commercials and composed several songs, including "I Love You" for tvN drama All About My Romance. On 24 May 2013, a month after winning, the siblings signed an exclusive contract with YG Entertainment.

2014–2015: Debut with Play and first concert 

Akdong Musician debuted with album Play and three lead singles on 7 April, twelve months after winning K-pop Star 2. All tracks were written and produced by Chan-hyuk. The first single, "200%", was chosen by Yang Hyun-suk, "Melted", was chosen by Akdong Musician, and "Give Love", was determined by the fans. Play claimed number one on the Gaon Charts and number two on Billboard's US World Albums Chart. The duo's debut stage was on K-pop Star 3 on 6 April. The music video for "200%" was released on 7 April, where "200%" topped all South Korean charts, with all songs on Play also charting high. The music video for "Melted" and "Give Love" was out on 14 April and 2 May respectively. "Give Love", became the third high-charting song, after "200%" and "Melted". On 16 June, they participated in YG Family's cover project of Taeyang's "Eyes, Nose, Lips". Their first live concert tour, "AKMU Camp", began on 21 November at Blue Square Samsung Card Hall, Hannam-dong, Seoul.

On 10 October, Akdong Musician released the digital single, "Time and Fallen Leaves", written and composed by Lee Chan-hyuk. Originally, it was planned as a lead single of Play, but was held back for an October release due to suiting the autumn season more. The song made an "all-kill" two consecutive days after release by ranking number 1 on nine major real-time music charts. It also ranked number one on the weekly Gaon Digital Chart the second week of release. The song was not given a music video so the listeners would imagine their own stories.

On 5 November, Su-hyun joined YG Family supergroup Hi Suhyun with labelmate Lee Hi. Their debut single, "I'm Different" (나는 달라), was released on 11 November, followed first stage at SBS' Inkigayo on 16 November and first win one week later. On 9 October 2015, the duo released the single "Like Ga, Na, Da" (가나다같이) with a video in celebration of South Korea's "Hangul Day". It was a joint production of YGE and Woori Card.

2016–2018: Puberty series and Military enlistment 

On 4 May 2016, they released their first EP titled Spring, the first record on a new album series named Puberty. The album was promoted with the release of two lead singles: "Re-Bye" and "How People Move". Ahead of comeback, the art film "Welcome Home" was released on 26 April. It starts out playful in a fantasy-like world until later the ending gives the feeling of an "Uncanny Valley" effect. All songs debuted within the top ten of the Gaon Chart, with "Re-Bye" becoming a chart-topper. Billboard named Spring the fourth best K-pop album of the year, where the record "boast a more theatrical feel to them to show the young duo is growing an exciting pace." To promote Spring, the duo performed at the Seoul Forest park in front of 10,000 people. Later in the year, they toured throughout Asia, holding showcases at Taipei, Kuala Lumpur, Singapore and Shanghai.

On 1 January 2017, they released the short film "Spring of Winter" ahead of comeback for their second seasonally themed album, Winter. In the film, playing themselves, they argue and disband Akdong Musician, while songs from the new album act as the soundtrack. On 3 January, the duo released their second studio album Winter, the second in a conceptual two-part album series Puberty. with lead singles "Last Goodbye" (오랜 날 오랜 밤) and "Reality" (리얼리티). Both lead singles were chosen by fans through the live broadcast of MBC's My Little Television. "Last Goodbye" became the second best-selling song within the first half of 2017, earning "Song of the Year" for the month of January at the Gaon Chart Awards and a digital bonsang at the Golden Disc Awards. The duo began a tour holding concerts in seven cities nationwide, including eight sold-out shows in Seoul from 23 March onward. The siblings choose small yet multiple venues so they are able to interact and be more intimate with the audience.

On 15 March 2017, Akdong Musician released a digital single in collaboration with Yang Hee-eun called "The Tree" (나무). On 20 July, the siblings released their first single album titled Summer Episode, with lead singles "Dinosaur" and "My Darling". Notably, the single "Dinosaur" marks the duo's first time experimenting with the genre EDM, whereas "My Darling" is an upbeat acoustic track. They decided not to promote the singles on music shows as they believed the single "Dinosaur" would not fit well with the music program's fancy stages, further adding the key is too high for a live performance thus wasn't viable. On 13 September, YG Entertainment confirmed Chan-hyuk would enlist for his mandatory military enlistment on 18 September with the Korean Marines, thus halting all Akdong Musician activities. Meanwhile, Su-hyun occupied her time with solo activities as a radio DJ at KBS Cool FM's Volume Up, permanent cast member on JTBC's Begin Again, soundtrack release for tvN drama Mr. Sunshine and more.

2019–present: Sailing and continued success 
On 29 May 2019, Chan-hyuk successfully fulfilled his mandatory military service with the Republic of Korea Marine Corps and was discharged, thus also simultaneously resuming the activities of Akdong Musician. While serving, they officially chose Chan-hyuk's self-written and produced song to represent the Corps. Su-hyun first revealed the song through KBS Cool FM Volume Up. The sibling duo's first appearance since hiatus was on JTBC variety show Knowing Bros with Jeon So-mi on 8 June. Filming took place a day after release. The duo performed at the 2019 Someday Festival on 31 August, where they also revealed an unreleased song titled "시간을 갖자", later revealed to be on their album Sailing.

On 4 September 2019, it was announced Akdong Musician will return with their first comeback since 2017 in late September. Ahead of their comeback, a mood teaser was released with Su-hyun's voice among crashing waves and an acoustic guitar, followed concept teaser "Begin Sailing." The sibling duo released their third studio album Sailing on 25 September with lead single "How Can I Love the Heartbreak, You're the One I Love" (어떻게 이별까지 사랑하겠어, 널 사랑하는 거지). Through Nylon, Chan-hyuk revealed he wrote most of the songs on Sailing inside a ship over two years in midst of enlistment inspired by the new profound experience. Ahead of release, their lead single was first performed on 19 September at the 2019 Someday Festival. Notably, this release marks Su-hyun's first participation among their albums with song "작별 인사", where she was credited as the arranger. Their lead single reigned as the number one spot on all seven major music streaming platforms in South Korea upon release, alongside the rest of the tracks also charting relatively high. The lead single went on to claiming the number one spot on the Gaon Digital, Download, and Streaming chart for the month of October. The same day, they also announced they would primarily go by AKMU, to symbolize their growth, as their original name translated to "mischievous child." The duo further elaborated the decision was made in order to not be limited in their future music. The duo held a live stage titled Sailing On A Fall Night at Yeouido Hangang Park on 29 September garnering over 30,000 people, 7-8 times larger than the size of the venue.

On 8 November 2020, it was announced that they would make their comeback on 16 November 2020 with the single "Happening". According to Chanhyuk, the single plays the role of "connecting to our next full-length album."

On 26 January 2021, they re-signed with YG Entertainment for 5 more years.

On July 26, 2021, AKMU's second EP Next Episode was released, with "Nakka" featuring IU as its lead single. Described as a "collaboration album", the EP comprises seven songs, with each track featuring a different artist. "Nakka" debuted at number three on Gaon Digital Chart for the week ending July 31, 2021. The following week, "Nakka" rose to the number one spot on the chart, becoming the duo's seventh number one single.

Members
 Lee Chan-hyuk (이찬혁) – lead vocals, rap, lyricist, composer, producer
 Lee Su-hyun (이수현) – main vocals

Discography

 Play (2014)
 Winter (2017)
 Sailing (2019)

Filmography

Concerts and tours

AKMU 1st Live Tour "AKMU Camp"

AKMU Studio

AKMU "Diary"

AKMU Sailing Tour

Publications
 Raise Your Voice High! (목소리를 높여 high! (열림과 성장의 악동뮤지션 음악 에세이)) (Maribooks)

Awards and nominations

References

External links 

 

K-pop music groups
K-pop Star winners
Musical groups established in 2012
Sibling musical duos
South Korean musical duos
South Korean expatriates in Mongolia
South Korean pop music groups
YG Entertainment artists
2012 establishments in South Korea
Korean Music Award winners
Melon Music Award winners
South Korean co-ed groups
Pop music duos
Male–female musical duos